Herts/Middlesex 4 was a tier 12 English Rugby Union league that was organized by the London and South East Division Rugby Football Union.  It was the fourth division competition for clubs in Hertfordshire and parts of north-west London that traditionally belonged to the historic county of Middlesex.  Promoted teams moved up to Herts/Middlesex 3 and since the cancellation of Herts/Middlesex 5 there was no relegation.  

It involved a number of formats over the years, switching between a single division and regional (north/south) divisions.  Herts/Middlesex 4 folded at the end of the 2009-10 season with most teams being promoted automatically to Herts/Middlesex 3.

Participating Clubs 2009-10
British Airways
Chess Valley  
GWR
Harrow
Hayes  
Northolt
Southgate
Sudbury & London Springboks

Original teams

When this division began in 1996 it contained the following teams:

Feltham - transferred from Middlesex 2 (8th) 
Hammersmith & Fulham - transferred from Middlesex 2 (9th) 
Hayes - transferred from Middlesex 2 (13th)
London Cornish - transferred from Middlesex 3 (runners up)
Old Ashmoleans - transferred from Hertfordshire 1 (8th) 
Old Grammarians transferred from Middlesex 3 (4th)
Old Isleworthians - transferred from Middlesex 2 (10th)
Old Standfordians - transferred from Hertfordshire 1 (6th)
Pinner & Grammarians - transferred from Middlesex 2 (12th)
Royal Hospitals - promoted from Middlesex 4 (champions)
Royston - transferred from Hertfordshire 1 (7th)
Southgate - transferred from Middlesex 3 (3rd)

Herts/Middlesex 4 honours

Number of league titles

Hatfield (2)
British Airways (1) 
Chess Valley (1)
Feltham (1)
GWR (1) 
Harrow (1)
Ickenham (1)
Kilburn Cosmos (1)
London Tribes (1)
Old Ashmoleans (1)
Old Streetonians (1)
Old Tottonians (1)
Osterley (1)
Quintin (1)
Southgate (1)
Sudbury & London Springboks (1)

Notes

See also
London & SE Division RFU
Hertfordshire RFU
Middlesex RFU
English rugby union system
Rugby union in England

References

Defunct rugby union leagues in England
Rugby union in Hertfordshire
Rugby union in Middlesex